List of seismic fault (and systems, zones) in Mexico

Baja California Peninsula
 Agua Blanca Fault
 Borrego Fault
 El Carrizal Fault
 La Paz Fault
 San Miguel Fault Zone

Gulf of California Rift Zone (GCRZ)
From north to south

Imperial Fault
El Indiviso Fault
Cerro Prieto Fault
Laguna Salada Fault
Ballenas Fault
Partida Fault
San Lorenzo Fault
Guaymas Fault
Carmen Fault
Farallon Fault
Atl Fault
Murillo Fault
Pescadero Fault
Tamayo Fault
Rivera Transform Fault
Santa Anna Madrid Fault

Yucatan
 Santa Maria Fault

Central Mexico
 Acambay-Tixmadejé Fault System
 Pastores Fault
 Venta de Bravo-Pastores Fault System
 Chapala-Tula Fault Zone

Southern Mexico
 Chixoy-Polochic Fault
 Motagua Fault
 Oaxaca Fault
 Donaji Fault

Geology of Mexico
Plate tectonics
Geography of Mexico
Seismic faults of Mexico
Seismic zones of Mexico
Seismic faults